Print process simulation uses interactive simulation software to reproduce the operating conditions of complex multi-colour printing presses that often cost several million dollars. Simulators are available for different printing process technologies (Offset Sheetfed, Heatset and Coldset Web Offset; Flexographic and Gravure Packaging), includes their consumables (like inks, plates, paper and other substrates) and where pertinent, in-line packaging operations (such as folding, cutting, label creation).

Simulation in education and training 

Press operators get ‘hands-on’ experience in quality control and problem solving without the costs, dangers or unstructured training associated with learning on actual presses. A wide variety of printing conditions and problems are covered  that are used for training, skills assessment, performance enhancement and process analysis. Simulation is a means of presenting infrequent problems before they happen so that they can be recognized when they do occur.  Exercises can evaluate specific competencies and if they are used to solve problems. When possible, simulators training scenarios are linked to industry-standard curricula like PIA, the NAA (Newspaper Association of America) and the Flexographic Technical Association.

Printing simulation 

Typical systems include monitoring and cost analysis that allows the training process to correlate with versus the waste, cost and time on a ‘real’ press. The simulators can either be either connected to a press control console (like the 'cockpit' in a flight simulator) or run on standard micro computer hardware with single or multiple screens. Internet-based learning management systems now allow simulation exercises to be made in a one language/location and reviewed in another language by a training supervisor in a different location – what is traced is the interaction with the process, not the local name of the controls.

 it is estimated that over 2000 print simulators are installed worldwide (in 2013).  Users include technical schools, universities, printing companies and their suppliers, who find that they cut costs, accelerate training time, and give a more thorough grounding in structured problem solving

Simulators from Sinapse are used alongside real presses in the EuroSkills and WorldSkills competitions to select the best printer.
Simulation based training is well adapted for the learning habits of today's world 

In 2013 the print simulation cloud-based learning system (DLMS)  won a PIA (Printing Industries of America) Intertech Award: 
Language-independent, it automatically analysed and compares training results from different countries, in different languages.
This DLMS was used at worldskillsLeipzig 2013 to analyze and compare results from contestants using simulators in 10+ languages.

References 

 RIND Survey, January 2012, "Simulated press problem focusses on tackling production problems"
 Printing News, May 14, 2001, "Useful as Training Assistants, Print Simulators taking off in print shops everywhere"

Printing